Syed Shafayetul Islam is a retired major general of the Bangladesh Army and a politician. He served as Military Secretary to Prime Minister of Bangladesh, Sheikh Hasina, from 1996 to March 2000.

Biography
Syed Shafayetul Islam was born in Kishoreganj.. His father, Syed Nazrul Islam, was the acting president of the Mujibnagar Provisional Government of Bangladesh. His brother, Syed Ashraful Islam, was a Bangladeshi politician and minister who was the sixth General Secretary of Bangladesh Awami League. His sister, Syeda Zakia Noor Lipi, is the MP of Kishoreganj-1.

References 

Living people
Bangladesh Army generals
Bangladeshi military personnel
People from Kishoreganj District
Awami League politicians
Bangladeshi people of Arab descent
Year of birth missing (living people)